The First Soviet Antarctic Expedition was led by Mikhail Somov; his scientific deputy was . The expedition lasted from 30 November 1955 to 1957 and involved 127 expedition members and 75 crew members.

Three diesel-electric ships were used to transport the expedition. They were RV Ob (flagship; captain ), RV Lena (captain A. I. Vetrov) and the refrigerator ship No. 7 (captain M. A. Tsygankov). The final ship was used only for transporting perishables. Ob and Lena were icebreakers 130m long and displacing 12,600 tons.

On 30 November 1955 Ob left port at Kaliningrad.

The principal task of the expedition was to organise the main base, Mirny, and perform limited scientific observations. Other tasks were reconnaissance of sites for the inland bases Vostok and Sovetskaya; and oceanography of the Indian ocean.

References 
 A V Nudel Man Soviet Antarctic Expeditions 1955-1959, Izdatel'stvo Akademii Nauk SSSR, Moskva, 1959 (translated from the Russian; Israel program for scientific translations, Jerusalem, 1966).

Further reading 
 Gan, I. (2009) "The reluctant hosts: Soviet Antarctic expedition ships visit Australia and New Zealand in 1956", Polar Record, 45, (232) pp. 37–50. ISSN 0032-2474 
Gan, I. (2009) "The Soviet Preparation for the IGY Antarctic Program and the Australian Response: Politics and Science, Bolet%#237;n Antártico Chileno 2nd SCAR Workshop on the History of Antarctic Research, 22-22 September 2006, Santiago, Chile, pp. 60-70. [Non Refereed Conference Paper]

External links 
 History of organization of the first Soviet/Russian Antarctic expedition 1955–57 and its international importance in the Antarctic studies by N. Kornilov (ZAO «INTAARI», St. Petersburg, Russia)]

 01
Antarctic Expedition 01
Antarctic Expedition 01
Antarctic Expedition 01
1955 in Antarctica
1956 in Antarctica
1957 in Antarctica